Wyman Ford is a fictional character found in many of the solo novels by American author Douglas Preston.

Background
Ford was an agent in the Central Intelligence Agency for several years, all prior to his first appearance in literature. His wife was also a CIA agent, but she was killed when a car they were in during a stakeout in Cambodia was bombed. Ford became depressed and spent some time in a Benedictine monastery (The Monastery of Christ in the Desert) near Abiquiu Tewa-Towa Pueblo and Jicarilla Apache country in the American Southwest. Eventually, after 30 months, he left the monastery and started his own private investigation firm. 

The events in Tyrannosaur Canyon occur during his time in the monastery, while the events in Blasphemy mark the first assignment of his investigation agency, which is given to him by Dr. Stanton Lockwood III, science advisor to the President of the United States. Blasphemy also reveals some more of Ford's backstory at UC Berkeley, where he met and fell in love with Kate Mercer, who also appears in Blasphemy. Ford and Lockwood both return in Impact and The Kraken Project, continuing Ford's investigative work on behalf of the government.

Wyman Ford is a devout Catholic, though he has struggled with his faith since the death of his wife.

Education
Bachelor of Arts in Anthropology from Harvard University
Master's degree in Computer Science from Massachusetts Institute of Technology
Doctorate in Cybernetics from Massachusetts Institute of Technology

Appearances in literature
 Tyrannosaur Canyon (2005)
 Blasphemy (2008)
 Impact (2010)
 The Kraken Project (2014)

Fictional secret agents and spies
Fictional Central Intelligence Agency personnel
Fictional Christians
Fictional private investigators
Characters in American novels
Fictional Harvard University people